On 16 March 2016, two female suicide bombers, thought to be members of Boko Haram, killed 22 people worshiping at the Molai-Umarari mosque on the outskirts of Maiduguri, Nigeria. The first bomb detonated at around 5am as worshipers were beginning their early morning prayers.

One of the women disguised herselfas a man to allow her to access areas of the mosque usually inaccessible to women. She positioned herself in the front row of the mosque, then detonated her explosives as people stood up for prayers.

The attacks came soon after the Nigerian president, Muhammadu Buhari, claimed that Boko Haram were "technically defeated". In the aftermath, to defend these claims, military officials downplayed the severity of the incident as a 'common' event, experienced by 'countries around the world'.

Significance of location 

Maiduguri is the birthplace of the armed wing of Boko Haram. The mosque was located in Umamari, a village  from the city, which has been turned into the command center for the Nigerian military's defense against the group. An almost identical attack was made to the mosque five months ago, with only the head imam surviving. The mosque had only re-opened three days prior to the latest event.

See also 
 Timeline of Boko Haram insurgency

References

2016 murders in Nigeria
Suicide bombings in Nigeria
Mass murder in 2016
Terrorist incidents in Nigeria in 2016
Boko Haram mosque bombings
Massacres perpetrated by Boko Haram
Islamic State of Iraq and the Levant in Nigeria
March 2016 events in Nigeria
2010s massacres in Nigeria